The Extraordinary and Plenipotentiary Ambassador of Peru to the Republic of Panama is the official representative of the Republic of Peru to the Republic of Panama.

Both countries established relations on December 18, 1903, after the Separation of Panama from Colombia. Relations have continued since, with both countries having close ties both historically and currently.

List of representatives

See also
List of ambassadors of Peru to Central America
List of ambassadors of Peru to Costa Rica
List of ambassadors of Peru to El Salvador
List of ambassadors of Peru to Guatemala
List of ambassadors of Peru to Honduras
List of ambassadors of Peru to Nicaragua

Reference

Panama
Peru